Lyubomir Ivanov (born 12 December 1981) is a Bulgarian footballer. He is currently playing for Partizan Cherven Bryag as a midfielder.

References

External links 
 

Bulgarian footballers
1981 births
Living people
Sportspeople from Pleven
PFC Spartak Pleven players
PFC Vidima-Rakovski Sevlievo players
FC Dunav Ruse players
FC Montana players
First Professional Football League (Bulgaria) players
Second Professional Football League (Bulgaria) players

Association football midfielders